BAPA may refer to:

 British Amateur Press Association, an amateur press association founded 1890
 British Amateur Press Association (comics fandom), an amateur press association active 1977-2004
 Birds Australia Parrot Association, a special interest group of the Royal Australasian Ornithologists Union
 Los Angeles High School of the Arts, formerly known as the Belmont Academy of Performing Arts
 Beta-peptidyl aminopeptidase, an enzyme

See also 
 Bapa (disambiguation), a surname and honorific